Tisbury may refer to several places:
Tisbury, Wiltshire, England, a village in England
Tisbury railway station 
Tisbury, Massachusetts, USA, on the island of Martha's Vineyard; named after Tisbury, Wiltshire, England
West Tisbury, Massachusetts, USA, a town on Martha's Vineyard that was formerly part of Tisbury
Tisbury, New Zealand, suburb of Invercargill